V2_, Lab for the Unstable Media, founded in 1981, is an interdisciplinary center for art and media technology in Rotterdam, the Netherlands.

V2- presents, produces, archives and publishes about art made with new technologies and encourages the debate on these issues. It offers a platform where artists, scientists, developers of software and hardware, researchers and theorists from various disciplines can share their findings.

It was the main organizer of the Dutch Electronic Art Festival, which grew out of the Manifestations for the Unstable Media that V2_ organized since 1987.

Over the years V2_ has collaborated with many artists and theorists, including for instance: Stelarc, Orlan, Symbiotica, Dick Raaymakers, Michel Waisvisz, Francisco López,  Brian Massumi, Manuel de Landa, Paul Virilio, Rafael Lozano-Hemmer, Knowbotic Research, Achille Mbembe, and Rem Koolhaas.

Events and Residencies
V2_ has organized many residencies for emerging artists in the field of art & technology, a.o. through the Summer Sessions.

Publications
V2_ has published a number of books on interactive art and related subjects like sociology, media theory, biology, and technological innovation.

1990s
Book for the Unstable Media, 1992
Interfacing Realities, 1997
TechnoMorphica, 1997
The Art of the Accident, 1998

2000s
Machine Times, 2000
Book for the Electronic Arts, 2000
TransUrbanism, 2002
My First Recession, 2003
Making Art of Databases, 2003
Information Is Alive, 2003
Feelings Are Always Local, 2004
Understanding Media Theory, 2004
aRt&D, 2005
Interact or Die!, 2007
Dick Raaijmakers, Monografie, 2008
The Architecture of Continuity, 2008

2010s
The Politics of the Impure, 2010
The Sympathy of Things, 2011
Vital Beauty, 2012
Iedereen Een Kunstenaar, 2014
Een Stuk Van Mij Gaat Een Paar Keer, 2014
Giving and Taking, 2014
On the Threshold of Beauty, 2014
The War Of Appearances: Transparency, Opacity, Radiance, 2016
Wat Is Community Art?, 2016
Machines Will Make Better Choices Than Humans, 2016
Everyone Is An Artist, 2016
To Mind is to Care, 2016

2020s
40 Years of V2_, 2021
Sandra Trienekens: Participatieve kunst, 2021
Marije Baalman: Composing Interactions, 2022
Achille Mbemble: The Earthly Community, 2022

References

External links
 V2_ website

New media art
Art in Rotterdam